Karim Saïdi (born 24 March 1983) is a Tunisian former footballer who last played for Belgian club Lierse SK. He now runs a coffee shop in Tunisia. He was part of the squad that won the 2004 African Cup of Nations.

Club career

Club Africain
When Karim was 10 years old he joined Club Africain, one of the major clubs in Tunisia. He made his debut in the  Tunisian national team against Morocco in 2003.

Feyenoord
In 2004 the right-footed defender moved to Feyenoord Rotterdam after advice from his friend Hatem Trabelsi and signed a contract till 2008. During his first season he was the first choice in Feyenoord's central defense, as a result of which he played 30 matches in the Dutch Eredivisie.

Lecce
As of 2005/06, Saïdi lost his spot in the starting eleven. Determined to play as a regular in order to increase his chances to be in the Tunisian squad during the FIFA World Cup 2006, he moved on loan to US Lecce of Italian Serie A on January 31, 2006. He made 9 appearances with Lecce and gained a place in the Tunisian squad for the FIFA World Cup 2006.

Feyenoord return and Sivasspor
Following the World Cup, Karim returned to Feyenoord for the 2006/2007 season. He remained at the club until January 2008, when he moved on loan to Sivasspor in January 2008. Karim made a good impression in the Turkish first division helping the club secure an impressive fourth place allowing it to participate in its first ever European cup.

Return to Club Africain
On October 9, 2008 he signed a four-year contract with his former club Club Africain.

Tour FC
Failing to reassert himself in his childhood club, he signed a two-year deal with Tours FC in June 2009.

Lierse SK
On July 9, 2011 Saidi signed a two-year contract with Belgian Pro League outfit Lierse SK.

In January 2015, Saidi went on trial with Kazakhstan Premier League side FC Irtysh Pavlodar, but did not earn a contract.

Honours
Tunisia
 Africa Cup of Nations: 2004

References

External links
 
 Career stats - Voetbal International 

1983 births
Living people
Tunisian footballers
Feyenoord players
U.S. Lecce players
Sivasspor footballers
Eredivisie players
Club Africain players
Tours FC players
Lierse S.K. players
Tunisia international footballers
2004 African Cup of Nations players
2005 FIFA Confederations Cup players
2006 FIFA World Cup players
Tunisian expatriate footballers
Expatriate footballers in the Netherlands
Tunisian expatriate sportspeople in the Netherlands
Expatriate footballers in Italy
Tunisian expatriate sportspeople in Italy
Expatriate footballers in Turkey
Tunisian expatriate sportspeople in Turkey
Serie A players
Süper Lig players
Ligue 2 players
Belgian Pro League players
Expatriate footballers in France
Expatriate footballers in Belgium
Footballers from Tunis
Association football defenders